Yugoslavia was a state concept among the South Slavic intelligentsia and later popular masses from the 19th to early 20th centuries that culminated in its realization after the 1918 collapse of Austria-Hungary at the end of World War I and the formation of the Kingdom of Serbs, Croats and Slovenes. However, the kingdom was better known colloquially as Yugoslavia (or similar variants); in 1929 it was formally renamed the "Kingdom of Yugoslavia".

Origins of the idea 

The first idea of a state for all South Slavs emerged in the late 17th century, a product of visionary thinking of Croatian writers and philosophers who believed that the only way for southern Slavs to regain lost freedom after centuries of occupation under the various empires would be to unite and free themselves from tyrannies and dictatorships.

In 1848, a plan was created for the creation of a South Slavic Federation. The plan initiated by the Serbian government was made up of the members of the Secret Belgrade Circle, among whom there were people close to the ruling circles.

The Serbs and the Croats, as the most conscious of the Yugoslavs, lay down the foundations of their political future, and by accepting them they promise that they will strive for their realization in a single direction, as far as the external environment permits this for each branch (the Yugoslavs):
 For all Slavs, the federation system is accepted.
 The Yugoslavs will form a Yugoslavian state headed by one leader – a king. The position will be hereditary.
 The Yugoslavs are divided into 3 Yugoslav tribes: the Serbs, the Croats and the Slovenes.
 Every tribe will have: complete autonomy before the legislature – the national assembly – headed by the deputy of the king, will manage its funds, offices, internal and church affairs, and so on. The deputy will elect the clerks among the local population and present them to the king for royal approval.
 The king will have a ministry composed of the most capable of all tribes. At the national assembly, all three tribes will be represented equally. Armed forces will also be represented equally. The armed forces will also be concentrated and their costs will be distributed equally.
 Each tribe will be given the opportunity to educate its people in its own dialect, and the Serbian language and the Cyrillic alphabet will be accepted for the administration and literature.
 The Eastern Orthodox Church and the Catholic Church will be on an equal footing. Their services and practices will be equal and in liturgical language if necessary.
 The Croatian tribe refers to the following areas: Croatia and Slavonia (with a Military Border), Istria with the districts of Krajina, Carinthia and Slavic Styria, Bosnia from the land border to Vrbas and northern Dalmatia to Cetina, to Split and Zagreb districts where the capital of the Croatian kings was formerly located.
 The Serbian tribe covers the following areas: Serbia, Sofia, Macedonia, Zeta, Bay of Kotor and Dubrovnik, southern Dalmatia together with its islands, Herzegovina, Bosnia from Vrbas to Drina and Syrmia with Vojvodina.
 All other areas refer to the Bulgarian tribe.
 The tribes will help each other with the liberation of their shared land from foreign invaders.
 Each Yugoslav tribe will preserve its ethnic name, but to foreign affairs they will all be Yugoslavs, and their state Yugoslavia.

In the 19th century, the Illyrian movement, as it came to be called, attracted many prominent Croatian intellectuals and politicians. It started gaining large momentum only at the end of the 19th century, mainly because of the Revolutions of 1848 and the policies against freedom movements of southern Slavs. However, ideas for a unified state did not mature from the conceptual to a practical state of planning, and few of those promoting such an entity had given any serious consideration to what form the new state should take.

As the Ottoman Empire grew weaker and Serbia, Bulgaria, and Greece grew stronger after the Berlin Congress, there was new hope for sovereignty of the South Slavic peoples in Austria-Hungary, and the idea of a union between them gained momentum. Scholar Aurel Popovici proposed a reform called the "United States of Greater Austria" in 1906. Although his proposal was not acted upon by the Habsburg Emperor it was an inspiration for the peace conferences at the end of World War I.

Thomislav Bacurin in the early 19th century was one of the conceivers of Yugoslavia. The Yugoslav idea was forged by the Polish and other Western Slavic emigrants in the West who saw that a Russo-Austrian division of the Ottoman Empire must be prevented at all costs and a common state of all South Slavs forged. He enlisted Frantisek Zach (a Moravian enthusiast of Slavic reciprocity) and sent him to Belgrade on that mission with a drafted plan the "Načertanije".

In Vienna on 31 May 1917, Anton Korošec read the May Declaration in which the Slovenian people requested that the Austro-Hungarian Empire change from a dual to a triple monarchy: Austria-Hungary should not be divided to only Austria and Hungary anymore, but to three parts: Austria, Hungary and Yugoslavia. Yugoslavia would have consisted of separate Slovene, Croat and Serb entities from within the empire. The declaration was rejected.

Yugoslav Committee 

During the early period of World War I (which started in 1914), a number of prominent political figures, including Ante Trumbić, Ivan Meštrović, Nikola Stojadinović and others from South Slavic lands under the Habsburg Empire fled to London, where they began work on forming a committee to represent the South Slavs of Austria-Hungary, choosing London as their headquarters.

The Yugoslav Committee was formed on 30 April 1915 in London, and began to raise funds, especially among South Slavs living in the Americas. These Yugoslavs were Serbs, Croats, and Slovenes who identified themselves with the movement toward a single Yugoslav or South Slavic state. Exiled Yugoslavs living in North America and Britain were the primary supporters of the Yugoslav Committee. Because of their stature, the members of the Yugoslav Committee were able to make their views known to the Allied governments, which began to take them more seriously as the fate of Austria-Hungary became more uncertain.

While the committee's basic aim was the unification of the Habsburg South Slav lands with the Kingdom of Serbia (which was independent at the time), its more immediate concern was to head off Italian claims on Habsburg territories in Istria and Dalmatia. In 1915, the Allies had lured the Italians into the war with a promise of substantial territorial gains in exchange. According to the secret Treaty of London, these included Istria and large parts of Dalmatia, which had mixed Italian and Slavic populations.

Corfu Declaration 

In 1916 the Serbian Parliament in exile decided in favor of the creation of the Kingdom of Yugoslavia at a meeting inside the Municipal Theatre of Corfu.
During June and July 1917, the Yugoslav Committee met with the Serbian government in Corfu and, on 20 July, a declaration that laid the foundation for the post-war state was issued. The preamble stated that the Serbs, Croats and Slovenes were "the same by blood, by language, by the feelings of their unity, by the continuity and integrity of the territory which they inhabit undividedly, and by the common vital interests of their national survival and manifold development of their moral and material life." The future state was to be called the Kingdom of Serbs, Croats and Slovenes and was to be a constitutional monarchy under the Karađorđević dynasty.

State of Slovenes, Croats and Serbs 

As the Habsburg Empire dissolved, a pro-Entente National Council of Slovenes, Croats and Serbs took power in Zagreb on 6 October 1918. On 29 October, a Yugoslavist Croatian Sabor (parliament) declared independence and vested its sovereignty in the new State of Slovenes, Croats and Serbs, and two days later it declared its wish to enter state of union with Serbia and Montenegro. Soon afterward on 5 November the National Council in Zagreb asked the Serbian military for help in controlling anarchy in Croatia. Because help did not arrive before the end of November, the National Council again asked the Serbian army for help because: "The population is in revolt. We have total anarchy and only the Serbian army can restore order".

The Yugoslav Committee was given the task of representing the new state abroad. However, quarrels broke out immediately about the terms of the proposed union with Serbia. Svetozar Pribićević, a Croatian Serb, a leader of the Croatian-Serbian Coalition and vice-president of the state, wanted an immediate and unconditional union. Others (non-Serbs), who favoured a federal Yugoslavia, were more hesitant. The leader of opponents was Stjepan Radić who demanded the creation of a South Slavs Confederacy in which there would be three heads of state: the Serbian king, the Croatian ban, and the president of the Slovenian national council. In his thinking, the confederacy was to have only ministers for foreign affairs, for defense and for the distribution of food. This proposition was rejected by the National Council of Slovenes, Croats and Serbs as an example of separatism. The National Council, whose authority was in fact limited, feared that Serbia would simply annex the former Habsburg territories; on the other hand, the Italians were moving to take more territory than they had been allotted in the London Pact.

Political opinion was divided, and Serbian ministers said that if Croats insisted on their own republic or a sort of independence, then Serbia would simply take areas inhabited by the Serbs and already controlled by the Serbian Army. After much debate and after Syrmia, which was under control of the Serbian army, declared secession, the National Council agreed to a unification with Serbia, although its declaration stated that the final organization of the state should be left to the future Constituent Assembly which would make final decisions only with a two-thirds majority.

With the acquiescence of the National Council achieved, the Kingdom of Serbs, Croats and Slovenes was declared on 1 December 1918 in Belgrade.

Kingdom of Serbia 

In the 1915 Serbian campaign the Serbian Army suffered a complete defeat by the Central Powers and Serbia was overrun. Nevertheless, after recuperating on Corfu, the Serbians returned to combat in 1917 on the Macedonian front together with other Entente forces. Serbian and French forces began to defeat Austro-Hungarian and Bulgarian forces in the Vardar valley in September 1918 and, on 30 September 1918, Bulgaria surrendered. A month later in the Battle of Vittorio Veneto, the last Austro-Hungarian armies were defeated and the Empire was dissolved.

Serbian military forces quickly overran the territory of the Kingdom of Serbia (including the present-day North Macedonia) as well as that of the Kingdom of Montenegro, Banat, Bačka and Baranja and Syrmia, but stopped on the borders of the other Habsburg territories that would form the short-lived State of Slovenes, Croats and Serbs, anticipating an official union between them and Serbia.

Syrmia 
After the collapse of Austria-Hungary, Syrmia became part of the newly formed State of Slovenes, Croats and Serbs. On 29 October 1918 the Parliament of the Kingdom of Croatia-Slavonia (an autonomous kingdom within the Austro-Hungarian Empire) severed ties with Vienna and Budapest. On 5 November 1918 the town of Zemun invited the Serbian Royal Army to protect the city from the withdrawing forces of the Central Powers. On 24 November 1918 as per the decision of self-determination, local parliamentary deputies from the Serb-inhabited parts of Syrmia which historically corresponded to the Serbian Voivodship constituted a National Council in Ruma. Members from the western part of the county, mainly inhabited by ethnic Croats (Šokadija region), did not have representatives in this assembly. The National Council, fearing that unification would not be achieved and concerned that the leadership in Zagreb was facing numerous difficulties and was slow to act, decided to join in the creation of a common state of Serbs, Croats and Slovenes. The Council decided in addition that, in the event that such a project of unification went unrealized, it would join the state as a part of the Serbian people's land.

Banat, Bačka and Baranja 

With the defeat of the Central Powers and the impending crumbling of the Austro-Hungarian Dual Monarchy, the monarchy collapsed and various regions were taken over by local self-styled National Councils beginning in the summer of 1918. Serb and other Slavic representatives founded the "Serb National Committee" in Novi Sad, which soon formed branches all across Banat, Bačka and Baranja in order to create a provisional administration. It particularly aimed at including other Slavs, most notably the Bunjevci. The Committee drafted a para-military militia, known as the "Serb National Guard", to secure its interests. Fearing that the troops would be too weak to face the Central powers, on 5 October 1918 the Pančevo local administration sent a plea to Belgrade for the protection of the Serbian Royal Army.

In Temeschwar on 1 November 1918 the local Social Democratic Party proclaimed a Banat Republic with the intention of preserving the Banat as a multi-ethnic region against Serbian and Romanian claims. The Republic was not able to achieve control over most of the territory it claimed, and, because the Belgrade Agreement of 15 November 1918 and previous Allied mandates to Serbia had mandated it to be taken over, the Serbian Army entered western and central parts of Banat (including Temeschwar) and abolished the republic; the Romanian army entered the eastern part of the region. Bačka and Baranja were also handed over to provisional local Serbian administration that governed from Novi Sad: after welcoming the Serbian Army, the Serb National Committee proceeded to finish taking over the administration from Hungarian authorities. The committee had previously formed rules to elect a National Council, which would decide about the self-determination of the majority people of the region, the Serbs (Slavs), as per the agreement with the provisional Hungarian government (which had broken off relations with Austria about a month before). All ethnic Slavs over the age of 20 had the right to vote. Democratic in spirit, the election introduced women's suffrage.

On 25 November 1918 the "Great People's Assembly of Serbs, Bunjevci and other Slavs from Banat, Bačka and Baranja", with 757 representatives elected in 211 municipalities, was constituted. 578 representatives were Serbs, 84 Bunjevci, 62 Slovaks, 21 Rusyns, 6 Germans, 3 Šokci, 2 Croats and 1 was Magyar. Two currents were opposed at the parliament, the Democratic and the Radical option. The weaker Democratic side wanted close ties to the State of Slovenes, Croats and Serbs, and as a compact part of the former South Slavic area of Austria-Hungary, they wanted to enter negotiations with the Kingdom of Serbia; they emphasized the unity of the Yugoslavian people and rejected inner divisions among national groups. The Radicals under Jaša Tomić, on the other hand, argued that the three peoples had different cultural, religious and historical backgrounds and that, although a Yugoslavian state was inevitable, these peoples could not be treated as a single ethnic group, and thus that an immediate unconditional union with the Kingdom of Serbia was needed first to mark out an ethnic Serbian territory. In the end the Radical option won because of the fear that if union with Serbia was not realized immediately, Vojvodina might find itself outside of Serbia in the end. The parliament decided as well that the territories created under the ceasefire were permanent, and that they were to be merged into the Kingdom of Serbia. It proclaimed itself the provisional legislative body for the regions and elected a provisional executive body, the People's Administration for Banat, Bačka and Baranja, under Dr. Jovan Lalošević. Although government in Belgrade accepted the decision of unification of this region with Serbia, it never officially recognized newly formed provincial administration.

After the Kingdom of Serbs, Croats and Slovenes was proclaimed, the National Council elected its share of members of the Provisional National Representorship of Serbs, Croats and Slovenes. Baranja became a hideout for communist and other refugees from Miklós Horthy's White Terror. The Treaty of Trianon had assigned most of the Baranja region to Hungary, which led to massive protest and a group of people under painter Petar Dobrović to proclaim a Serb-Hungarian Baranya-Baja Republic. This Republic lasted only a few days, and on 25 August 1921 it was invaded and annexed by Hungary, in accordance with Hungarian borders defined by the Treaty of Trianon. The Treaty of Trianon assigned to Hungary some of the most northern territories under Serbian control, in which a minority of South Slavs remained. On the other hand, sizable German and Magyar minorities were left within the Kingdom's borders. Central Banat was granted to Romania, as the region was divided on ethnic grounds, so as to contain a majority of the populations, leaving a minority of Yugoslavs in Romania and a minority of Romanians in the Kingdom of SCS. The BBB region remained a historical entity in the united realm until 1922 when a new administration was adopted in accordance to the unitary system. The region was split among the Bačka (with center in Novi Sad), Belgrade and Podunavlje (with center in Smederevo) administrative areas. When the Kingdom of Yugoslavia was proclaimed in 1929, most of the region eventually became a part of the Danubian Banate, with a small part going to the City of Belgrade.

Montenegro 

Montenegro was originally created by the national-romantic desire of liberation the lands which belonged to the State of Zeta, later of unification of South Slavic lands, and remained conservative in its ideology as compared with the other parts of the future Yugoslavia. In 1848 Prince-Bishop Petar II Petrović-Njegoš accepted the Zagreb-inspired proposal of the Serbian government to create a common state of all southern Slavs known as "Yugoslavia" and cooperated on the matter, but requested first a unification of the Serbs unification and later one with Bulgarians and Croats. In 1907 parliamentarism was born in Montenegro, and the first political party, the People's Party, expressed the need to cooperate and bond with other Slavic peoples, along with Serbian national unification and liberation. Entering gradually into periods of cold relations with Serbia and disappointed that he and his country had lost the primate in the Serb revolution, HRH Nicholas I of Montenegro accepted union with Serbia and in 1914 initiated the process, which was however interrupted by World War I; he also accepted the idea of a Yugoslavian realm.

Shortly after entering the war on the side of Serbia to support escape of Serbian army toward Greece, the Kingdom of Montenegro was occupied by Austro-Hungarian military forces in early 1916. During exile Serbia and all other Allied powers recognised the King's government-in-exile as the government of Montenegro. In the spring of 1916 the King proclaimed Andrija Radović as prime minister, but he resigned a few months after his proposal of union with Serbia was rejected. He created in 1917 the National Committee for Unification with Serbia, which found support from Nikola Pašić's Serbian Government. In 1918 the Allies took control of Montenegro and mandated a common mission for its occupation. On 15 October 1918 the Government of Serbia named a "Central Executive Committee for Unification of Serbia and Montenegro" that would organize the process of unification. Ten days later the Committee decided to schedule a nationwide election with new election laws.

With this decision against the Montenegrin constitution, the committee created by Serbia had abolished the Montenegrin parliament and reversed the order of the King for a session of the parliament on first day after an armistice was signed. The official reason for this decision was that 2/5 of the parliament members were abroad, making it necessary to elect new ones. An election was held without a list of eligible voters, and the vote was reportedly controlled by officials from Serbia.  The Podgorica Assembly (formally the Great National Assembly of the Serb People in Montenegro) elected in that way and encircled by detachments of the Serbian army decided on 26 November 1918 to dethrone the King and the House of Petrovic-Njegos in favor of the House of Karadjordjevic and to unite with Serbia, pending a common state of Serbs, Croats and Slovenes.

The Podgorica Assembly elected a provisional executive body known as the "Montenegrin Committee for Unity with Serbia" under Marko Daković which oversaw Montenegro's integration, until the SCS's government took over on 23 April 1919. The Assembly also elected its share of representatives into the Provisional National Representorship of the Kingdom of Serbs, Croats and Slovenes.

Reaction to these events escalated in early 1919 into the Christmas Uprising by opponents of annexation. International leaders opposed the uprising and the Serbian forces violently quelled the rebellion.

Bulgaria 

Bulgaria fought on the side of the Central Powers during World War I which lost the war. Initially, the Allies had attempted to persuade the country to join the Allies by having Serbia cede large parts of Macedonia to Bulgaria in exchange for gaining Bosnia-Herzegovina and an outlet to the sea in the Treaty of London in 1915. The Serbian government was unwilling to officially confirm this offer and Bulgaria eventually joined the Central Powers. However, by the end of the war, many Bulgarian politicians became interested in joining the newly formed Yugoslav state alongside extant Bulgarian supporters of a united South Slavic state such as Aleksandar Stamboliyski. Their reasons included to avoid paying war reparations for having fought the Allies, and to unite with their ethnic brethren in Macedonia. One initial plan considered by the Serbian leadership was to accept the Treaty of London 1915 in which Serbia gained Bosnia-Herzegovina, Slavonia, and Southern Dalmatia and cede Macedonia to Bulgaria, and then constitute a Yugoslav state between Serbia and Bulgaria. Under this proposal, the largely Croat and Slovene areas would remain part of the Austro-Hungarian monarchy and would be liberated at a future date. This plan never materialized, partly because the Allies decided to scrap the Treaty of London in favor of self-determination and partly because the Austro-Hungarian Monarchy itself collapsed leaving all the South Slav areas free to join a Yugoslav state.

Aftermath 

A plebiscite was also held in the Province of Carinthia, which opted to remain in Austria. The Dalmatian port city of Zara (Zadar) and a few of the Dalmatian islands were given to Italy. The city of Fiume (Rijeka) was declared to be the Free State of Fiume, but it was soon occupied by the Italian poet and revolutionary Gabriele D'Annunzio for several months. Turned into a "free state", Fiume was annexed with Italy through a bilateral agreement between Rome and Belgrade in 1924. Tensions over the border with Italy continued, however. Italy claimed other parts of the Dalmatian coast (from which the majority of the Italian-Venetian population escaped in 1919–1922), whereas Yugoslavia claimed Istria, a part of the former Austrian Littoral which had been united with Italy as part of the former Venetian Republic, and
whose main cities had been inhabited by Italian-Venetian people, but whose rural population consisted of South Slavs (Croats and Slovenes).

See also 
Adriatic Question
Kingdom of Yugoslavia
Yugoslavia
Congress of Oppressed Nationalities of the Austro-Hungarian Empire

Notes

References 

 
The Birth of Yugoslavia, Volume I, Henry Baerlain, 1922, L. Parsons, London
The Birth of Yugoslavia, Volume II, Henry Baerlain, 1922, L. Parsons, London
Beiträge zur Banater Geschichte: Die Turbulenzen der Jahre 1918-1919 in Temeschburg by Richard Weber 
Podgorička skupština by Mijat Šuković 
The Corfu Declaration, 20 July 1917
Yugoslav National Council's Address to Prince Alexander of Serbia, 24 November 1918
The First Yugoslavia: Search for a Viable Political System - by Alex N. Dragnich (Englisch)
Prince Alexander's Address to Yugoslav National Council, November 1918
 

 
Foundations of countries